Matton (Ancient Greek: Μάττων) in Greek mythology is a hero of the meal, specifically the kneading of dough.

See also
 Ceraon
 Deipneus
 List of Greek mythological figures

Characters in Greek mythology